Martin Bačík (born 24 January 1989) is a Czech professional football player who currently plays for FC Tescoma Zlín. He has represented his country at youth level.

References

External links
 
 Profile at FC Tescoma Zlín website

Czech footballers
1989 births
Living people
Czech First League players
FC Fastav Zlín players

Association football forwards